Khimlal Gautam is a Nepalese mountaineer and Chief Survey Officer in the Survey Department, Government of Nepal. He is the world's only civil servant and surveyor to scale the Mount Everest twice. He is also the highest-ranking government official from the Nepal government to have summited Everest. He is the first surveyor along with Rabin Karki to reach the top of the mountain to measure, with the aid of state-of-the-art technology, the actual altitude of the peak.

Early life and education 
He was born in the Hadaule Village of Kaski District. He has completed his Masters in Geographical Information Science and Systems from Universität Salzburg.

Since childhood, Khimlal has been enamored with the Himalayas.

First summit 

In 2010, the Gorkhapatra daily newspaper published an advertisement inviting interested Nepalese civil servants to apply for the first civil servant expedition to summit Mount Everest which was for the promotion of the Visit Nepal Year 2011. He applied for the mission and was chosen as a reserve candidate. Later, one of the team members withdrew and he got to be a part of the team. At 5:20 am on May 18, 2011, he was the first member of his team to reach the summit.

Second summit 
The 2015 Nepal Earthquake may have altered the height of Mt Everest. In 2017, Nepal's Survey Department commissioned a team of surveyors to prepare for an Everest expedition in the hopes of resolving the issue. Gautam was selected as the team leader for this expedition because of his previous experience on mountaineering and his engineering skills. KP Oli, the Prime Minister of Nepal, said goodbye to the expedition team on April 10, 2019. After 26 days at Base Camp preparing, planning, and acclimating for the final push for the summit they began their climb on May 18. Two days later they encountered weather issues and wind turbulence while at the South Col taking a final break before the summit. Gautam discovered that there were insufficient oxygen bottles there. Their main Sherpa told him that the mission was almost impossible and requested to descend to camp two. He knew the mission would fail if they descended considering his previous experience on Mount Everest. On May 22, he reached the summit of Mount Everest at 3 a.m. along with his colleague Rabin Karki and a Sherpa.

Book
 Pandhraun Chuli (2022)

Reference

 Year of birth missing (living people)
 Living people
 Nepalese surveyors
 Mount Everest expeditions